Mohamed Nour Arale is a Somali politician. He previously served as the Minister of Interior of Somaliland from 2010 until 2013.

See also

 Ministry of Interior (Somaliland)
 Politics of Somaliland
 Cabinet of Somaliland

References

Living people
Interior Ministers of Somaliland
Somaliland politicians
Year of birth missing (living people)